The Reprua is a river in the Gagra District of Abkhazia, Georgia.

Sources of the river are the springs in karst Krubera Cave. The Reprua flows into the Black Sea, in the southwestern outskirts of Gagra.

Based on an ancient Abkhazian legend, reprua are the tears of the children of the underground spirit. An underground spirit lived on the shores of the Black Sea with his son and 3 daughters. Suli was forging weapons for his boy and the warriors who guarded the only entrance to Abkhazia, the Gagra Pass.

The weapons he forged were invincible, and the girls made food and clothes. After the death of the soul, no one could renew the weapon, and so his son and the warriors who stood by him were defeated in an unequal war against numerous armies that came from distant lands. Those who went south destroyed the 3 cave entrances through which the sisters came to the surface to see their brother. When the sisters realized that their brother was dead, they started crying. Tears formed small streams, which at the exit of the cave formed rivers Reprua, Anikhamtsa and Bagarepsta.

See also
Roe River, in the United States, also claimed to be the shortest river in the world at 
D River, also in the United States and claimed to be the shortest river in the world at 
Ombla, in Croatia, claimed to be the shortest river in the world at

References

Rivers of Abkhazia